Welham Boys' School is a boarding school located in Dehradun, India. The school is a residential school for boys and is affiliated with CBSE. It is ranked amongst the top five boys' boarding schools in the country as per the Education World rankings 2021.

History
Welham was founded in 1937 as a preparatory school for boarding schools in England and India, by Miss Oliphant, an English lady, with a capital of £1000. There were no funds or staff, and no school buildings. Miss Oliphant recruited another retired English lady, Miss Grace Mary Linnell, to run the boarding school for girls, and Miss Linnell became the Founder-Principal of Welham Girls School. Under Miss Linnell's guidance Welham Girls High School, as it was known then, established itself as a boarding school. Today the ratio of teachers to students on campus stands at 9:1.

In 1956 Miss Oliphant donated all her assets to the Welham Boys' School, which presently is administered by a board of trustees. Mr. S. K. (Charlie) Kandhari took over as principal in January 1983.
Today the Welham Boys' School (WBS) is an active member of the Round Square group of cooperation. The school hosts model united nations conferences as well as military awareness seminars

Campus
Some major sites are the Learning Resource Center (LRC), the Activity Center, the White House (the oldest structure on campus), Bethany (Dining Hall), the hospital, the main field, lower grounds and various other fields, courts and ranges for sports.

The residencies are primarily the Oliphant House for Junior School, Shikhar Hostel for Jamuna and Ganga houses, Triveni for Cauvery house and Woodseats for Krishna house.

Notable alumni 

 Lt. General Prabodh Chandra Bhardwaj - Ex-vice army chief and a War hero from the Indo-Pakistan War of 1971 and member of the Board of Governors at the Welham Boys' School.
 Naveen Patnaik - Chief Minister of Odisha, India
 Mani Shankar Aiyar - Politician, ex-Cabinet Minister of India
 Swaminathan S. Anklesaria Aiyar, Economist.
 Shaad Ali - Film director
 Rajiv Gandhi - ex- Prime Minister of India
 Sanjay Gandhi - Politician
 Zayed Khan - Actor
 Vikas Kumar - Actor 
 Jubin Nautiyal - Bollywood singer
 Mansoor Ali Khan Pataudi - Ex- Cricket captain of India, Nawab of Pataudi
 Gautam Punj - Industrialist
 Vikram Seth - Writer
 Kunwar Sushant Singh- MLA Barhapur
 Wajahat Habibullah- First Chief Information Commissioner of India
 Miangul Aurangzeb -  last Wali Ahad (Crown Prince) of the former Swat State

References

External links 
 
Welham Boys School, Dehradun | Ammissione, recensioni, tariffe - Edustoke

Round Square schools
Boys' schools in India
Boarding schools in Uttarakhand
Schools in Dehradun
Educational institutions established in 1937
1937 establishments in India